David O'Brien (born 26 May 1965) is an Irish former yacht racer who competed in the 2000 Summer Olympics.

References

1965 births
Living people
Irish male sailors (sport)
Olympic sailors of Ireland
Sailors at the 2000 Summer Olympics – Star